Enterprise Bank Limited (EBL), also referred to as Enterprise Bank, is a commercial bank in Nigeria. It is licensed as a commercial bank by the Central Bank of Nigeria, the country's banking regulator.

Overview
Enterprise Bank is a large financial services provider in Nigeria. , the bank's total assets were estimated at US$1.63 billion (NGN:261.1 billion). According to the bank's website, shareholders' equity was valued at about US$186.5 million (NGN:29.8 billion) in August 2011.

History
Enterprise Bank was formed in August 2011 by taking over the assets and some of the liabilities of the now defunct Spring Bank, whose commercial banking license was revoked. EBL was issued a commercial banking license on 5 August 2011.

Ownership
, the assets of Enterprise Bank Limited are 100% owned by Asset Management Company of Nigeria (AMCON), an arm of the Federal Government of Nigeria. In 2015, Enterprise Bank was acquired by Heritage Banking Company Limited after an investment of ₦56 billion.

Governance
The chairman of the board of directors of Enterprise Bank Limited is Sir. Ogala Osoka MFR. The managing director and chief executive officer of the bank is Ahmed Kuru .

See also
 List of banks in Nigeria
 Central Bank of Nigeria
 Economy of Nigeria
 Spring Bank

References

External links
Website of Enterprise Bank Limited
 Website of Central Bank of Nigeria
Federal Government Appoints Leaders of Nationalised Banks

Banks of Nigeria
Banks established in 2011
Companies based in Lagos
Nigerian companies established in 2011